Pao fangi is a species of pufferfish in the family Tetraodontidae. It is a tropical freshwater species native to Vietnam. It was classified as a member of the genus Tetraodon (or Tetrodon, which is the genus that the species was initially described under according to ITIS) until 2013, when the genus Pao was created.

References 

Fish described in 1940
Tetraodontidae
Fauna of Vietnam